Gregory or Greg Carroll may refer to:
Greg Carroll (Australian actor), Australian actor
Gregory Carroll (R&B singer), American R&B singer
Gregory Carroll (tenor), American opera singer
Greg Carroll (ice hockey), Canadian ice hockey player